Asuravithu is a 2012 Indian Malayalam-language action film written and directed by A. K. Sajan, starring Asif Ali and Samvrutha Sunil in the lead roles. The film is a sequel to 2002 Indian Malayalam-language action gangster-thriller drama film Stop Violence starring Prithviraj Sukumaran in the leading role. The film opened to mixed reviews and was a box-office flop. This was the debut film of actor Mammootty's nephew Maqbool Salmaan. This Movie Was Dubbed In Hindi As Duniya Meri Mutthi Mein.

Synopsis
Don Bosco is a soft-spoken and religious young man who is studying in a seminary. He takes upon himself the task of bringing to heel the (Pathaam Kalam) gang, who killed his father years ago. Don meets head on with the Cochin underworld kings, and rechristens himself as Don Daveed. Henceforth his operations start bearing the brand of the D Company. The movie also has acid's son in the plot. He accompanies Don in the D company. It is shown that Don Bosco is the son of Daveed a.k.a. Satan.

Cast
 Asif Ali as Don Bosco/ Don Daveed (Asuravithu), Satan Daveed's son
Samvrutha Sunil as Marty, Don's love interest
Maqbool Salmaan as Messy
Jiya Irani as Aaron 
Vijayaraghavan as Abbaji
Becky Thomas as Vanessa
Vidyalakshmi as Ameera 
Rony David
Siddique as Shaikh Muhammed IPS
 Lena as Angel Daveed, Don's mother
 Baburaj as Father Ambarra Shaji 
 I. M. Vijayan as Valarpadam Kurudhu Musthafa
 Anil Murali as S.I Somashekharan
 Seema G. Nair
 Mehul James
 Ganapathi S Poduval as Zacharia Samuel
 Gayathri
 Vishnu Unnikrishnan as Anand
 Jagannatha Varma
 Harisree Ashokan as Father Mullu Murikan

Music
"Aadyaanuraa" – Amal Antony, Sithara Krishnakumar
"Aashaamarathin Mele" – Vijay Yesudas
"I Have Got You" – Piyush Kapur
"Kodumkaattaayee" – Benny Dayal

References

External links
 
 

2010s Malayalam-language films
2012 action films
Indian gangster films
Indian sequel films
Films shot in Kochi
WVoilence2
Films scored by Alphons Joseph
Films scored by Rajesh Mohan
Films directed by A. K. Sajan
Films scored by Govind Vasantha